Yegor Yevgenyevich Glukhov (born 19 May 1998) is a Russian footballer who plays as a midfielder for Novosibirsk. He is the son of former footballer Yevgeni Glukhov.

Club career
He made his professional debut in the Russian Cup for FC Tyumen on 24 August 2016 in a game against FC Sibir Novosibirsk. He made his Russian Football National League debut for Tyumen on 8 April 2017 in a game against FC Sibir Novosibirsk.

On 9 September 2021, Glukhov signed with Russian Football National League 2 club Saturn Ramenskoye.

References

External links
 Profile by Russian Football National League

1998 births
Living people
Russian footballers
Association football midfielders
FC Tyumen players
FC Saturn Ramenskoye players
Russian First League players
Russian Second League players